

Hermann Fischer (19 February 1894 – 12 April 1968) was a German general in the Wehrmacht during World War II. He was a recipient of the Knight's Cross of the Iron Cross of Nazi Germany.

Fischer surrendered to the Red Army on 8 May 1945 in the Courland Pocket. Convicted as a war criminal in the Soviet Union, he was held until 1955.

Awards and decorations

 Knight's Cross of the Iron Cross on 9 May 1940 as Oberst and commander of Infanterie-Regiment 340

References

Citations

Bibliography

 

1894 births
1968 deaths
Lieutenant generals of the German Army (Wehrmacht)
German Army personnel of World War I
Recipients of the clasp to the Iron Cross, 1st class
Recipients of the Order of the Cross of Liberty, 2nd Class
Recipients of the Knight's Cross of the Iron Cross
German prisoners of war in World War II held by the Soviet Union
People from Rhön-Grabfeld
People from Saxe-Weimar-Eisenach
Military personnel from Bavaria